Northallerton West is a temporary station built by the Wensleydale Railway as part of plans to link the railway with Northallerton, North Yorkshire, England.

History
In May 2014, Hambleton District Council agreed to provide £40,000 towards the estimated £51,000 cost of providing a temporary platform on land on the south-east side of Springwell Lane, Castle Hills, Northallerton, to establish a link between the Wensleydale Railway and the North Yorkshire town.

Work started on the station's construction in October 2014, with the official opening taking place on 22 November 2014. The first train to arrive at the new station was a four-coach service hauled by Harry Needle Railroad Company's 47715 in Fragonset livery.

It is hoped to re-open the line and station at a future date once work to upgrade the level crossing equipment is complete.

Future
The aim of the Wensleydale Railway in the long-term is to extend the line to Northallerton station and allow passengers to interchange with National Rail services. As this will require an agreement with Network Rail, the provision of the platform is an interim solution which will allow the track to be brought into more regular use whilst also bringing in extra income for the heritage railway.

See also
Railways in Northallerton

References

External links
Video and commentary on Northallerton West railway station

Heritage railway stations in North Yorkshire
Railway stations built for UK heritage railways
Railway stations in Great Britain opened in 2014
Northallerton
2014 establishments in England